is a Japanese anime series by Nippon Animation. Although "Romeo's Blue Skies" is the literal translation of the Japanese title, the official English name given by Nippon Animation is "Romeo and the Black Brothers". It is known in Arabic as "عهد الأصدقاء" (literally "Friends' Covenant"), in the Philippines as "Mga Munting Pangarap ni Romeo" (literally "Romeo's Simple Dreams"), and in Greece as "Τα Παιδιά των Καπνοδόχων" (literally "The Children of the Chimneys".)

It is based on the novel Die schwarzen Brüder ("The Black Brothers") written in 1941 in Switzerland by author Lisa Tetzner.

Plot

In the second half of the 19th century, in 1875, a young boy named Romeo lives in small Swiss village called Sonogno. The village is suffering due to a long drought, and Romeo's family is hit by it the worst, as they are also under debt. Meanwhile, Luini, a dismal man with the nickname "The God of Death", arrives in the village. Luini has his eyes on Romeo and plans to buy him from his parents to work as a chimney sweeper. Luini asks Romeo's father Roberto to sell him Romeo, but Roberto refused. In order to bind Romeo under a contract, Luini burns the remaining cornfield that belongs to Romeo's family. During this tragedy, Romeo's father receives a head injury which causes blindness. Romeo's family cannot afford to get a doctor for Roberto, as they have lost their livelihood. The doctor's fee is very expensive, as he has to come from a neighbouring village. Romeo decides to sell himself into slavery for 25 francs, and signs a contract to work in Milan for 6 months. Once Roberto has been treated, it is time for Romeo to leave, but just as he leaves he is told that none of the kids ever come back to the village, probably because they succumb to the harsh work conditions. He nonetheless has no choice, and leaves the same day. Along the way he meets a mysterious boy who is unwilling to reveal anything apart from his name, which is Alfredo. They both earn each other's mutual trust and respect after helping each other out. This is also where they meet another boy named Dante. Soon they are taken into a tavern and thrown into the basement where the other kids are kept, Dante included. A few of them try to escape, but in vain. Luini decides that they must be sold as soon as possible before they try to escape again, so he forces the children to cross the lake to Milan by boat in the middle of a storm. Their boat capsizes, but Romeo and Alfredo manage to survive, and everyone else is presumed to be dead. They see Luini drowning, but Romeo's good values do not allow him to let the man sink and he saves him, as he believes that is what his father would do.

Upon arrival in Milan, Romeo and Alfredo are separated and sold to two chimney sweeps, but not before Romeo and Alfredo swear eternal friendship. Romeo is bought by Marcello Rossi. Rossi is thoroughly manipulated by his wife who hates Romeo because of the cost that had to be paid for him, but is actually kind at heart. During one of their routine cleaning days, Romeo meets professor Casella who teaches him how to read. Although Romeo is denied food by Rossi's wife, their ill daughter Angeletta, who Romeo refers to as "the angel", helps him by sharing her food with him. Soon, Anzelmo, Rossi's son and a member of a street gang called the Wolf Pack, tricks Romeo into being friends so that he could steal the letter that Angeletta had written for him, but turns out the letter was actually a page from her diary, where she detailed all the lies said by Anzelmo. When the Wolf Pack read it, they mercilessly beat Anzelmo up for lying to them. Anzelmo, hurt badly, swears revenge against Romeo. He blames his wounds on Romeo, knowing that his mother would believe him no matter what, and accuses Romeo of stealing money from the Rossis and they call the police. Angeletta witnesses Anzelmo slipping their parents money into Romeo's bag, but faints due to her serious heart illness before she could reveal the truth. Romeo  manages to escape from the police just in the nick of time but is cornered by the Wolf Pack. Dante appears from nowhere and saves Romeo, who is thrilled to see that Dante is still alive. Meanwhile, Angeletta regains consciousness and reveals the truth to her parents, but Rossi's wife still wants Romeo imprisoned and forbids Rossi to say anything to the police. Dante also urges Romeo to leave the city as he is wanted by the police and helps him get onto a cart he believes is going to Venice. However, Nikita informs Dante that the cart is actually going to the prison, and is driven by criminals who plan to blow up the prison to free one of their own. The criminals lock Romeo up but he manages to escape and warn the police officers and Rossi just in the nick of time and ends up badly injuring himself. Rossi, moved by the act, decides to stand up to his wife and reveals that Angeletta had seen the real thief and he is none other than Anzelmo. After this, Rossi warms up to Romeo much more and greatly improves his living conditions, and learns to stand up to his wife's manipulations. Romeo finally meets Alfredo again, and they grab all the chimney sweepers to form an alliance called the Black Brothers to combat the Wolf Pack. They challenge the Wolf Pack to a bout and win. Giovanni, the leader, returns from a winning fight with the Scorpion gang (who disband to join the Wolf Pack after their defeat), and is outraged to hear that the Wolf Pack had lost to the Black Brothers. In retaliation, he orders his gang to kidnap a boy from the Black Brothers named Michaelo and demand to be handed Alfredo in exchange. When Alfredo refuses to kneel down in front of Giovanni, the latter proposes a battle at dawn. Initially they all fight (except Alfredo), but seeing as no one is able to gain the upper hand, Alfredo asks them to stop. Giovanni agrees and decides to make it a one-on-one fight. Tachioni volunteers to fight from the Wolf Pack and Romeo from the Black Brothers. However, midway Tachioni draws out a blade in spite of Giovanni's instructions to use only fists, luckily the reflection from Romeo's charm blinds Tachioni and he is able to defeat him. Giovanni accepts defeat and praises Alfredo for having good friends, but tells him that they will get even some day. 

Later, Dante and the Wolf Pack begin to notice that Angeletta's mannerism is totally different from the rest of her family, which leads to suspicions of her being adopted. Dante manages to extract part of the truth from his master (who is a close friend of Rossi). Romeo overhears a conversation between Rossi and Angeletta and decides to follow Rossi to a mansion, where it turns out that Angeletta is in fact the granddaughter of lady Isabella, a countess. Isabella's son, Adolfo, fell in love with a poor woman named Giovanna. However, Isabella did not approve of the difference in social status and thus the young couple left after they bore a child. Sadly, the parents passed away due to an illness and Isabella passed on the child to Rossi who was her childhood friend. Isabella is unwilling to let Angeletta into the mansion as she believes the latter is only after her wealth, and Romeo is willing to wager his life to prove her otherwise. Angeletta's condition worsens and she wishes to see her grandmother once before she dies. They sneak into the mansion and Angeletta gets to see her grandmother, but she coldly tells her to go back home. Angeletta, however thanks Isabella for allowing her to meet her and goes to the church to pray. She collapses in between, and goes into a coma. Dr. Casella says the only way to save her would be to take her to his acquaintance in Paris, who is a heart specialist. Romeo, the rest of the Black Brothers and Rossi try their best to convince Isabella, and she finally agrees after being moved by Romeo's devotion and friendship. She meets Angeletta and promises to take care of her in whatever way possible, and the next day, after a farewell, they leave for Paris by train.

In the following days, Romeo notices a huge crowd gathering outside a palace, and it turns out it is the grand wedding of the Duke of Milan. Romeo is called to clean the chimney of the hotel where all the invited nobles and royalties are staying. There, he finds Alfredo's younger sister, Bianca, staying along with her uncle and aunt. She runs away hoping to find her brother and Romeo along with Alfredo begin to search for her. Alfredo is visibly unwell, this could be attributed to the abuse he regularly went through at the hands of his master Citron, a cruel, vile man who spent all his money on drinking and gambling and thus Alfredo often went hungry and beat. Alfredo tells the story of how he and Bianca were the children of the aristocratic Martini family, Vittorio and Fatricia Martini, and how their father's younger brother Mauricio was extremely jealous of his success and wealth. Along with his wife, Grazela, they burn the house which kills Alfredo and Bianca's parents, but not before they hand them the precious treasure of the Martini family, a medal. Alfredo and Bianca flee the burning mansion and their uncle and aunt frame them for the fire in hopes of capturing them and ultimately retrieving the medal. Alfredo and Bianca run for days until they are taken in by a couple, who they beg to let them stay. The God of Death makes his way to the village, and Alfredo willingly sells himself into slavery to provide the family with enough funds to raise Bianca. However, Bianca is captured by their relatives soon after Alfredo sold himself.

Back in the present, Bianca is unable find Alfredo and Mauricio captures her, takes her back to the hotel and ties her up. Luckily, Nikita witnesses Bianca's capture and alerts Romeo and Alfredo. The Black Brothers come through, free her and tie up Bianca's aunt. Mauricio makes his way to the church as he heard that Alfredo was there, but Alfredo creates a distraction and with the help of Nikita, he escapes. Alfredo is re-united with his sister, but collapses and coughs blood. He is taken to professor Casella, who is worried that Alfredo's illness is terminal. Alfredo, however says that he cannot stay any longer and has to go back to his master as his contract is not over yet. Alfredo assures his friends that it was nothing serious and he just had a cold, and the reason he was coughing blood was because he had bit his tongue. Meanwhile, Mauricio orders for a fake medal to be made in order to prove his and Grazela's royalty to the king, while Alfredo and Bianca along with the Black Brothers devise a plan to sneak inside the castle to tell the king the truth. In the background Giovanni watches them, planning to confront Alfredo once and for all. Alfredo has a talk with Romeo and heads home. He is first stopped by Nikita, who is presumably waiting for him. As they talk, though, Alfredo begins to cough blood, while Nikita watches in horror. Alfredo begs her to keep it a secret, as he does not want to worry his friends. As he moves along, he is stopped again by Giovanni, but before the latter could finish the fight, he notices Alfredo's bad coughing and stops right in his tracks. Alfredo thanks him and leaves, making Giovanni uncomfortable. The rest of the Wolf Pack decide on their own to capture Alfredo on the same day he was supposed to meet the king. After trapping Alfredo inside a basement under the bridge, the pack run to Giovanni, who is enraged at their actions. Romeo, meanwhile is able to locate Alfredo as Mr Rossi had seen him go under the bridge. Romeo asks Alfredo to escape while he would stay back to stall the pack. When the pack reaches him, Giovanni is astonished at how dedicated and loyal Romeo is towards Alfredo. Nikita, no longer able to hold back, tells them that Alfredo is dying due to an illness, which happens to be the same illness that killed Giovanni's father, and this is not known to Romeo either. Giovanni decides to help Romeo and his group for the night. 

With the help of the Wolf Pack, they make their way through the castle, defeating Mauricio's bodyguards who try to kill Alfredo and Bianca. Meanwhile, Lady Isabella arrives back in Milan and sees Michaelo, who explains everything to her. Just as Alfredo and Bianca are about to meet the king, Mauricio takes Bianca as hostage, and before he could finish her off Nikita creates a distraction, due to which Alfredo and Romeo fall over the wall into the castle garden, but survive. They are successfully able to make it into the mansion, however the bodyguards capture the children. Luckily for them, Lady Isabella comes through revealing the identities of Alfredo and Bianca to everybody else and asks the bodyguards to leave the kids alone. When they refuse, she orders the king's guards to take them away, saving Alfredo and Bianca's lives. As Mauricio and Grazela are about to present the medal to the king, Alfredo pronounces the medal a fake, and claims he has the real medal. The king allows both parties to narrate their stories and Mauricio attempts to trap Alfredo and Bianca with his evil lies, but Mauricio is not aware of the fact that the king's father had marked something on the real medal- the mark of benediction, to honor the Martini family for showing true bravery in saving his life in war, which was missing from Mauricio's copy, and hence Alfredo and Bianca's names are cleared and their evil relatives are taken away. The Black Brothers celebrate their success before everyone leaves, except Alfredo and Romeo, who go to church, where they remember the moment they first met. Romeo thanks Alfredo for bringing hope into his life. Alfredo smiles, and says it wasn't him who was the ray of hope, but Romeo himself, and he thanks Romeo for bringing courage and hope into his life. Alfredo begins to succumb to his illness, he reminds Romeo of the oath they made- they would always be together, no matter how far away they are from each other, asks Romeo to fulfil the dreams he would not be able to achieve, and asks him to take care of Bianca. And with that, Alfredo peacefully passes away in Romeo's arms, leaving a heartbroken Romeo behind, crying for his dear friend.

Romeo can hardly concentrate on any of his day-to-day activities or work, and this angers the rest of the Black Brothers and Bianca. His refusal to accept Alfredo's death puts a strain on their relations. The Wolf Pack gang, particularly Nikita, were also saddened by Alfredo's death. To get Romeo back into his spirits, the Black Brothers organise a fight, where should he lose, he would be cast out. Romeo makes his way to the fight, and after taking a few punches and listening to Bianca and Dante's pleas, he finally snaps out of his trance, and finally realises what his late best friend had told him. He decides to go around town asking for donations for Alfredo's funeral. At his funeral, they sing the Black Brothers song in honour of Alfredo.

As the new leader of the group, he is presented with a challenge: to gather 20 lira, as they all want to watch the new circus that is in town. Romeo finds an old broken house that needed heavy fixes and repairs. Romeo volunteers to clean and repair the house, and seeing his dedication, the others along with Bianca pitch in too. On the day before the circus leaves, Romeo is unable to complete cleaning the second floor, but the woman is pleased with his efforts and pays him 20 lira anyway. However, Michaelo accidentally breaks a vase, which angers the shopkeeper and he takes Michaelo's pendent which was a gift from his mother. Romeo finds out, and without a moment's hesitation, trades the money for the pendent, a decision everyone agrees and praises him for. Happily, they all sit and share stories from their hometowns till the evening ends. While working one day, Romeo falls from a chimney. Dr. Casella agrees to have him and Bianca at his place until his leg heals. The doctor interests them both in many subjects, and Bianca begins to see Dr. Casella as a father. They help children at an orphanage as well. As a thank-you present, they hold a puppet show for Dr. Casella, where Bianca reveals that she wishes to stay with the doctor and become his nurse, while Romeo wishes to keep studying and become a teacher to educate and help others like Dr. Casella.

In 1876, when spring falls, the time has finally come for Romeo to return home in Sonogno, as his contract is over. Some of the boys have already left and some of them have a while still. Romeo takes his time to wish everyone goodbye, and although Mrs Rossi does not like to admit it, she does miss Romeo. Mr Rossi says that he would probably never get a helper like Romeo again, and Romeo thanks him and calls him his second father. As they are making their way, they see The Reaper with a new batch of kids. They visit Alfredo's grave one last time, where they finally make truce with the Wolf Pack, and Nikita promises to take care of Alfredo's grave. Dr. Casella drives them halfway to their home towns along with Bianca, and they all wish each other goodbyes and best of luck. Romeo returns to Sonogno and re-unites with his family, and 10 years later, in 1886, thanks to his hard work, he becomes a teacher and marries Bianca, and they name their child Alfredo. With that, the anime concludes.

Characters
 Romeo (ロミオ)
 Voiced by Ai Orikasa (Japanese) / Louie Paraboles (Filipino)
A young, optimistic boy who often courageously helps those around him without self-regard. (Originally named "Giorgio" in the novel "Die schwarzen Brüder") grew up to a loving family in Sonogno, a small village in Switzerland which is located near the Italian border. His father Roberto is a farmer, while his mother Jessica is a housewife. His biological father was killed in the war when he was very young, but it's not known. Romeo has twin brothers: Carlo and Pietro. He also has a grandmother named Maria and a pet ermine named Piccolo. When Romeo was still a child, he had the job of ringing the church bells every morning in his village. He also used to go fishing with his friends on sunny days. Romeo even helped his father on the jobs in their family's cornfield.

A long-standing drought struck Sonogno Village and many families suffered because of this, including Romeo's family. During this time, Luini, "The God of Death", came to the village, searching for boys that he could buy and sell to become chimney sweeps in Milan. Romeo unfortunately became Luini's interest. The 11-year old Romeo was forced to sell himself to the "God of Death" in order to get a doctor that could treat his father's illness. After Romeo signed a contract with Luini, a doctor from Locarno named Baregi was brought to Sonogno and treated Roberto. Romeo then sadly left his family and embarked on a long journey to Milan. It was during this journey that Romeo first met Alfredo, who saved him from an apple vendor who mistakenly accused him of stealing apples. Romeo and Alfredo quickly became best friends. Together they were sold in Milan by "The God of Death" to their respective bosses. Romeo was bought by Marchelo Rossi. Before Romeo and Alfredo separated, they swore eternal friendship and promised to each other that they would meet again.

Romeo experienced many hardships and triumphs while working as a chimney sweep in Milan. He experienced mistreatment by the Rossi family and was bullied by the Wolf Pack gang. Later, Romeo and Alfredo were reunited with each other. During the reunion, Alfredo revealed to Romeo his intention to create a fraternity for chimney sweeps that can help each other in times of need. Together they joined forces with other chimney sweeps in Milan and the Black Brothers were formed. Romeo and the other members of the fraternity chose Alfredo as their first leader. The Black Brothers defeated the Wolf Pack during their fights at San Babila Church and Sempione Park. The greatest triumph of Romeo in Milan happened when he learned to read and write through Professor Casella. With the help of the kind-hearted professor, the then "no read, no write" boy was brought to the world of knowledge. Romeo became knowledgeable in writing and even became fond of reading books like his best friend Alfredo. When Alfredo died of tuberculosis during a cold winter in Milan, Romeo became deeply depressed, but after hearing encouraging words from the Black Brothers and Alfredo's sister Bianca, he managed to accept his beloved best friend's death. Romeo succeeded Alfredo as leader of the Black Brothers. The first thing that he did as leader of the Black Brothers was to start a fundraising for Alfredo's funeral. The fundraising became successful and Alfredo was given a decent funeral.

Romeo fortunately finished his working contract in Milan when spring came. He then happily returned to his family in Sonogno Village.
Romeo was accompanied by his pet ermine Piccolo during his entire journey to Milan. He was also accompanied during his entire stay in the city mentioned and even when he returned home to Sonogno Village. Ten years after finishing his working contract in Milan, Romeo became a teacher. Romeo and Bianca (Alfredo's sister) were married and they named their first child after Alfredo.

 Count Alfredo Martini (アルフレド・マルティーニ)
 Voiced by Toshiko Fujita (Japanese) / Gloria de Guzman (Filipino) / Bouthaina Shaya (Arabic)
Romeo's best friend, and in the anime series the heir to a large fortune of 12 years old. Alfredo was also the founder and first leader of the Black Brothers. Born into a noble family, he was the only son of the couple Viscount Vittorio and Viscountess Patrizia Martini and the older brother of Bianca. Alfredo loved to read books. He and his sister Bianca grew up at the Martini mansion in Piedmont. Together they enjoyed a happy, peaceful life with their parents until a terrible tragedy struck their family. The siblings' were orphaned by their evil Uncle Maurizio and Aunt Grazela Martini who coveted all the treasures of Vittorio, especially the Martini medal. Their deep enviousness led them to burn the Martini mansion. Alfredo and Bianca's parents were killed during the incident, but before they died, Viscount Vittorio managed to entrust the Martini medal to Alfredo. The siblings escaped from the fire, bringing with them the medal. Maurizio and Grazela hunted the orphaned siblings for the medal. They even put on Alfredo and Bianca's heads the blame for the tragedy in Piedmont, making them wanted by the police.

A month after the burning of the Martini mansion, Alfredo and Bianca stumbled across a farm village. During this time, Alfredo's sister could no longer walk because of tiredness and because of this, they rested along the road. They were later found and rescued by a farmer. After the siblings' rescue, Luini, the "God of Death" appeared in the farm village. Alfredo then decided to sign a contract with Luini and go to Milan to work as a chimney sweep in order to protect Bianca. Alfredo embarked on a long journey to Milan, leaving behind his beloved younger sister in the farm village. It was during his journey to Milan that Alfredo first met Romeo, who at that time was mistakenly accused of stealing apples by a vendor named Tonio. The noble boy saved Romeo by showing and telling Tonio the proofs of Romeo's innocence. Alfredo and Romeo's friendship began then. Together they were sold in Milan by the "God of Death" to their respective bosses. Alfredo was bought by a very cruel man named Citron. Before Alfredo and Romeo separated, they swore eternal friendship and promised to each other that they would meet again. Alfredo experienced starvation and violence while he was living with Citron. There were days that he did not eat because the money that were supposed to be used in buying potatoes were wasted by his boss in buying liquors. There was also a time that Citron threw a bottle and a plate at him while cleaning the floor in their home.

Alfredo and Romeo later reunited. During the reunion, Alfredo revealed to Romeo his intention to create a fraternity for chimney sweeps that can help each other in times of need. They joined forces with other chimney sweeps in Milan and the Black Brothers was formed. All of the members of the alliance chose Alfredo to become their leader. As a leader of the Black Brothers, he was respected and admired by all of his companions for his intelligence and bravery. The Black Brothers victoriously defeated the Wolf Pack in their fights twice. First, at San Babila Church and finally at Sempione Park. The Black Brothers under Alfredo's leadership was also instrumental to Countess Isabella Montovani's acceptance of Angeletta as her granddaughter.

Alfredo's sister Bianca was captured by Maurizio and Grazela Martini and together they went to Milan. Knowing that Alfredo was in Milan and that the Martini medal was with him, the evil couple took Bianca hostage to get by force the medal from him. Romeo and the Black Brothers then saved Bianca from her evil relatives and brought her to San Babila Church, where she was reunited with Alfredo. During the reunion, Alfredo coughed blood and suddenly collapsed. He was brought to Dr. Casella and the doctor diagnosed that he had tuberculosis. Although the name of the disease was not mentioned to Alfredo, he was still aware about his terrible fate. Sensing that he could die anytime, Alfredo decided to entrust his only sister to Dr. Casella. He even decided to meet with the King of Italy to clear his and Bianca's tarnished names and to reclaim their inheritance. With the help of the Black Brothers, the Wolf Pack and Countess Montovani, the Martini siblings successfully met the king who was attending a banquet during that time. In the end, Alfredo proved to the King of Italy that he was really part of the Martini line by showing his father's medal with a "mark of benediction" from the king's father, Carlo Alberto of Sardinia. The king was also convinced that the Martini siblings truly did not kill their own parents.

 Alfredo Martini's Death The following day after the victorious meeting with the King of Italy, Alfredo died of tuberculosis. He died in the arms of his best friend Romeo. His last words were "Take care of Bianca". His death was mourned by all those who love him, especially Bianca, Romeo and the other living members of the Black Brothers. Romeo succeeded his late best friend as leader of the Black Brothers. The first thing that Romeo did as the new leader was to start a fundraising for Alfredo's funeral. The fundraising was successful. Alfredo was given a solemn funeral. Alfredo is the namesake of the son of Romeo and Bianca.

 Professor Casella (カセラ)
 Voiced by Kinryuu Arimoto
 Casella is a teacher and doctor in Milan. He has a large collection of books in his house. Professor Casella is a very kind man. He taught Romeo to read and write. The great professor brought the then 11-year old boy to the world of knowledge. In addition to these great deeds, he also took custody of Bianca Martini by the request of the dying Alfredo Martini. Dr. Casella treated Alfredo's younger sister as his real daughter. Every Saturday, the doctor goes to an orphanage and examines children.

 The Black Brothers A group of young chimney sweeps formed by Alfredo and Romeo, they consider each other as family and work together to solve conflict. In front of Alfredo's grave, the Black Brothers and the Wolf Pack made peace with each other.

 Members

 Dante (ダンテ)
 Voiced by Tomoko Ishimura (credited as Mifuyu Hiiragi)
 Dante is a funny boy with a huge ego who lives in Locarno. Romeo and Alfredo first met him when Alfredo's bag was stolen. Luini, the "God of Death," also sold Dante to work as a chimney sweep in Milan. He was bought by Matteo, the close friend of Marchelo Rossi. He saved Romeo from a beating by the Wolf Pack gang shortly after Anzelmo framed Romeo for theft and beating him up.
 Dante is one of the members of the Black Brothers. He develops a crush on Nikita. When spring finally came to Milan, Dante finished his working contract and returned to his hometown of Locarno. He first appeared in episode 4.

 Michaelo (ミカエル)
 Voiced by Hiromi Ishikawa
 Michaelo was one of the boys who was sold by Luini to work as a chimney sweep in Milan. Romeo and Alfredo first met him at a shop called The Wildcat in Locarno. While working as a chimney sweep in Milan, Michaelo joined the Black Brothers. Among the members of the Black Brothers, he is the most nervous and the easiest to fool. Michaelo is also called "crybaby" because he often cries. He first appeared in episode 5.

 Antonio (ダンテ)
 Voiced by Urara Takano
 Antonio first met Romeo and Alfredo at The Wildcat shop in Locarno, where they were detained for a while with Dante and Michaelo. He became a chimney sweep in Milan and joined the Black Brothers while working there. Antonio had a younger brother named Jusette, who worked as a chimney sweep in Milan earlier than him. Jusette failed to finish his working contract in Milan. After almost having no food for a whole month, he was found dead in the snow. Unlike his younger brother, Antonio luckily finished his working contract in Milan when spring came. He first appeared in episode 5.

 Augusto (アウグスト)
 Voiced by Kousuke Okano
 Augusto was a chimney sweep in Milan. He is one of the members of the Black Brothers. Romeo first him during his search for Alfredo. Augusto told Romeo that Alfredo once saved him from the bullying of the Wolf Pack gang. He first appeared in episode 15.

 Paulino (パウリーノ)
 Voiced by Megumi Tano
 Paulino was a chimney sweep in Milan who was saved by Romeo from the bullying of the Wolf Pack gang. He is one of the members of the Black Brothers. He first appeared in episode 15.

 Bartolo (バルトロ)
 Voiced by Hiromi Ishikawa
 Bartolo is one of the members of the Black Brothers who works as a chimney sweep in Milan.

 Giuliano (ジュリアーノ)
 Voiced by Mizue Otsuka
 Giuliano is one of the members of the Black Brothers who works as a chimney sweep in Milan.

 Enrico (エンリコ)
 Voiced by Chiko
 Enrico was a chimney sweep in Milan. Romeo first met him and Benalibo while searching for Alfredo at Milan's Ceruba Loko street. He was the one who told Romeo that: "There's no sweep in the area who doesn't owe him (Alfredo) one." Enrico is also a member of the Black Brothers. He first appeared in episode 15.

 Benalibo Marco (ベナリーボ)
 Voiced by Tetsuya Iwanaga
 Benalibo was a chimney sweep in Milan. Romeo first met him and Enrico while searching for Alfredo at Milan's Ceruba Loko street. Benalibo told Romeo that Alfredo gave him and Enrico a big potato and a big corn when they starved after having slaved through the night. He also joined the Black Brothers. He first appeared in episode 15.

 Luini (ルイニ)
 Voiced by Tetsuo Komura
A cruel man who visits towns to buy children. He later sells them as chimney sweeps making large sums of profit. 
Luini (Antonio Luini in the novel "Die schwarzen Brüder") is the man who is famously known as the "God of Death" or "Salot" in Tagalized Version. He visited in different towns and bought young boys including Romeo to sell as chimney sweeps in Milan. Mr. Luini's cruelty went as far as destroying the livelihood of Romeo's family in order to bind the then 11-year old boy under a contract.

 Citron (シトロン)
 Voiced by Masaharu Satou
 Citron was the man who bought Alfredo Martini. He is a gambler and very heavy drinker. Citron is also a cruel and violent man. When Matteo tried to buy Alfredo, Citron drew a blade and pointed it to him. Alfredo experienced cruelty and violence while with his boss. There were days that he did not eat because the money that were supposed to be used in buying potatoes were wasted by his boss in buying liquors. There was also a time that Citron threw a bottle and a plate at Alfredo while the young noble boy was cleaning the floor in their home. Citron's cruelty and violence against Alfredo greatly contributed to the early death of the beloved leader of the Black Brothers.

 Countess Bianca Martini (ビアンカ・マルティーニ)
 Voiced by Akemi Okamura
Alfredo's younger sister and only daughter of the couple Viscount Vittorio and Viscountess Patrizia Martini. She is a tomboy whose talents are dancing and playing the piano. Bianca and her big brother grew up at the Martini mansion in Piedmont. They enjoyed a happy, peaceful life with their parents until a great tragedy struck their family. Maurizio and Grazela Martini, the siblings' evil uncle and aunt who coveted all the treasures of Viscount Vittorio (especially the Martini medal), burned the Martini mansion. Bianca and Alfredo managed to escape with the Martini medal during the fire, while their parents were burned to death. Maurizio and Grazela hunted the orphaned siblings for the Martini medal. They even put the blame for the fire incident on Bianca and Alfredo's heads, making the siblings wanted by police. Bianca told Alfredo to cut her long, curly, blonde hair because of these reasons, hoping she will not be recognized by Maurizio and Grazela.

A month after the tragedy in Piedmont, Bianca and Alfredo stumbled across a farm village. During this time, Bianca could no longer walk because of tiredness. A farmer saw the siblings resting along the road and rescued them. Soon, the  Luini "The God of Death", appeared in the farm village. In order to protect Bianca, Alfredo decided to sign a contract with Luini and go to Milan to work as a chimney sweep. Bianca was left behind in the farm village.
Soon after Alfredo went to Milan, Bianca was captured by Maurizio and Grazela. Knowing that Alfredo was in Milan and the Martini medal was with him, the evil couple took Bianca hostage to forcefully get the medal from him. Bianca then was saved by Romeo and the majority of the Black Brothers from the hostage-takers. Later, she was brought at San Babila Church to be reunited with her older brother Alfredo, who at that time was already suffering from tuberculosis. After the Martini siblings were reunited, Bianca became a special member of the Black Brothers.

Bianca and Alfredo victoriously cleared their tarnished names and reclaimed their inheritance on the day that they met with the King of Italy. The king was convinced that the Martini siblings truly did not murder their own parents. The following day after the meeting with the King of Italy, Alfredo died. During the period of mourning for Alfredo, Bianca went to Romeo, who became very depressed because of what happened. She said comforting and encouraging words to Romeo and even hugged him. After hearing from Bianca, Romeo gained the strength to accept Alfredo's death and the request of his fellow Black Brothers to become their new leader. Before Alfredo died, Bianca was entrusted to Dr. Casella. The kind-hearted doctor and professor took custody of Alfredo's younger sister and treated her like his own daughter. Bianca became Dr. Casella's "little nurse." 10 years later, when Bianca finally became an adult, she married Romeo. They have a child who is named after Alfredo.

 Vittorio Martini (ヴィットリオ・マティーニ)
 Voiced by Kazuhiko Kishino
 Viscount Vittorio Martini was the father of Alfredo and Bianca. His wife was Viscountess Patrizia Martini. A noble man from Piedmont region of Italy, he was an army officer during his younger days. Vittorio was one of the soldiers who fought against the Austrian army at Custoza. It was during the battle at Custoza that Vittorio risked his own life for the sake of Carlo Alberto, the King of Sardinia. The life of the King of Sardinia was saved and the Austrian army was defeated in the battle because of that heroic act. In recognition of Vittorio's heroism, Carlo Alberto gave Viscount Martini a medal with a "mark of benediction." The medal is a precious treasure of the Martini family. It became a lifelong source of pride for Vittorio. It also became a cause of great tragedy to the Martini family. Vittorio's younger brother Maurizio and his wife Grazela coveted all the treasures of the viscount, especially the medal. Because of this, the evil couple burned the Martini mansion, killing Viscount Vittorio and his wife Viscountess Patrizia.

 Before the viscount and his wife were burned to death, the precious Martini medal was entrusted to Alfredo.

 Patrizia Martini (パトリツィア・マティーニ)
 Voiced by Sanae Takagi
 Viscountess Patrizia Martini was the mother of Alfredo and Bianca. She was also the wife of Viscount Vittorio Martini of Piedmont. Patrizia and her husband died after the Martini mansion was burned by Maurizio and Grazela Martini. They were survived by their children, Alfredo and Bianca.

 Maurizio Martini (マウリッツィオ・マルティーニ)
 Voiced by Nakata Kazuhiro
 Maurizio is the husband of Grazela. He is also the evil younger brother of Viscount Vittorio Martini and uncle of the siblings Alfredo and Bianca. Maurizio and Grazela extremely envy the viscount. They coveted all the wealth of Viscount Vittorio, especially the Martini medal. Their deep enviousness led them to burn the Martini mansion in Piedmont. Viscount Vittorio and his wife Viscountess Patrizia were killed during the incident. Alfredo and Bianca managed to escape from their burning mansion with the Martini medal. The evil couple hunted the siblings for the medal. They even put on Alfredo and Bianca's heads the blame for the tragedy in the Martini mansion.

After Alfredo sold himself to work in Milan, Maurizio and Grazela captured Bianca. Knowing that Alfredo was in Milan and the Martini medal was with him, they made Bianca a hostage to forcefully get the medal from him. Romeo and the majority of the Black Brothers then saved Bianca from the evil couple. Bianca was later reunited with her brother Alfredo. Maurizio and Grazela failed to get the Martini medal from Alfredo, but they still did not give up on their evil plans.

Before the evil couple went to a banquet that was attended by the King of Italy, Maurizio hired a man to create a replica of the Martini medal. The fake medal was finished and Maurizio wore it on the day of the banquet, hoping he and his wife will not get caught as impostors. Upon learning about the presence of Alfredo and Bianca in the banquet, Maurizio and his bodyguards tried to eliminate the siblings, but with the help of the Black Brothers, Wolf Pack, and Countess Isabella Montovani, the siblings were saved. Accompanied by Countess Montovani, Alfredo and Bianca met with the King of Italy and faced off with their evil relatives. While they were all in front of the king, Alfredo told the king that Maurizio's medal is a fake and that the one he holds is real. To see who is the "low-down skunk up to his neck in lies," the King of Italy examined the two Martini medals. Later, the king found out that Maurizio's medal is truly fake because there is no "mark of benediction" in its back and that Alfredo's medal is the one with a "mark of benediction." The evil couple were caught as impostors and taken away in disgrace. In the end, Maurizio and Grazela did not get all that they wanted, Alfredo and Bianca victoriously cleared their tarnished names and reclaimed their inheritance.

 Grazela Martini (グラゼーラ・マルティーニ)
 Voiced by Soumi Yoko
 Grazela is the wife of Maurizio Martini and sister-in-law of the couple Viscount Vittorio Martini and Viscountess Patrizia Martini. She is also the evil aunt of the siblings Alfredo and Bianca (and the more evil of her and Maurizio). Grazela and her husband extremely envy Viscount Vittorio Martini. They coveted all the treasures of the viscount, especially the Martini medal. Their deep enviousness led them to burn the Martini mansion in Piedmont, killing Viscount Vittorio and his wife. During this time, Alfredo and Bianca managed to escape from their burning mansion with the Martini medal. Maurizio and Grazela hunted the siblings for the medal. They even put on Alfredo and Bianca's heads the blame for the tragedy in the Martini mansion.

After Alfredo sold himself to work in Milan, Grazela and Maurizio captured Bianca. Knowing that Alfredo was in Milan and that the Martini medal was with him, they took Bianca hostage to forcefully get the medal from him. Romeo and the majority of the Black Brothers then saved Bianca from the evil couple. Bianca was later reunited with her big brother Alfredo. Grazela and Maurizio failed to get the Martini medal from Alfredo, but they still did not give up on their evil deeds.

Before the evil couple went to a banquet attended by the King of Italy, Grazela's husband Maurizio hired a man to create a copy of the Martini medal. The fake medal was finished and the evil couple brought it with them to the banquet, hoping they will not get caught as impostors. The siblings Alfredo and Bianca also managed to go to the banquet with the help of the Black Brothers, Wolf Pack, and Countess Isabella Montovani. Accompanied by Countess Montovani, the siblings met with the King of Italy and faced off with their evil relatives. While they were all in front of the king, Alfredo told the king that the Martini medal which was brought by Grazela and Maurizio is a fake and that the one that he holds is the real one. To know who is the liar, the King of Italy examined the two Martini medals. Later, the king found out that the evil couple's medal is really fake and that the medal from Alfredo is the real one because of the "mark of benediction" in its back. Grazela then tried one last effort to fool the king by trying to make it appear that Alfredo swapped the medals, but because she and Maurizio did not originally know about the "mark of benediction" she was unable to convince the king. The evil couple were therefore caught as impostors and taken away in disgrace. In the end, Grazela and Maurizio did not get all that they wanted, Alfredo and Bianca successfully cleared their tarnished names and reclaimed their inheritance.

 Piccolo (ピッコロ)
 Romeo's pet ermine, who strangely retains its winter coat throughout the series.

 Marchelo Rossi (マルチェロ・ロッシ)
 Voiced by Masahiro Anzai
 Romeo's boss, who bought him. Marchelo Rossi, commonly known just by his surname Rossi, was the man who bought Romeo from Luini, the "God of Death." He is a heavy drinker.
Marchelo used to be easily manipulated by his selfish, bossy, fat wife Edda, but later he gained the courage to speak out his mind and do everything that he thinks is right. He did everything that he could to make Romeo's life easier in Milan. Romeo considers Rossi as his second father.

Marchelo has one son, Anzelmo, and one foster daughter, Angeletta, the granddaughter of Countess Isabella Montovani. Angeletta was entrusted to Marchelo by Lady Isabella when she was still an infant. He took care of Angeletta until the countess finally accepted her granddaughter. He first appeared in episode 7.

 Edda Rossi (エッダ・ロッシ)
 Voiced by Yasuko Hatori
 Edda is the bossy, selfish, fat wife of Marchelo Rossi, the man who bought Romeo. She is also the mother of Anzelmo and foster mother of Angeletta. Edda used to hate Romeo, and because of that, she and her son mistreated Romeo. Edda even reached to the point that she wanted Romeo to be imprisoned, although Angeletta had confessed to her and Marchelo that Anzelmo was the one who really stole their money. However, in the last episode, Edda cried when Romeo bid the Rossi couple goodbye after finishing his working contract in Milan. She somehow realized that Romeo became a great help to the Rossi family. She first appeared in episode 7.

 Countess Angeletta Montovani (アンジェレッタ・モントバーニ)
 Voiced by Maria Kawamura 
Angeletta is a beautiful girl who lives with Rossi and is the granddaughter of the "Ice Queen," Countess Isabella Montovani. Her father, Count Adolfo Montovani, was the only son of the countess, while her mother, Giovanna, was a commoner. Both of her parents died without being personally recognized by her. When Angeletta was still a baby, she was entrusted by Lady Isabella to Marchelo Rossi. She was not accepted by her grandmother at that time, due to her dislike towards her mother and her belief that Angeletta would come after the Montovani estate. She first appeared in episode 7 when she first saw Romeo being led by Rossi to a cell which was later destroyed and built to a bed in episode 14.

Angeletta was raised by her foster parents, Marchelo and Edda. Unlike her foster parents' real child, Anzelmo, she is an extremely kind person. Angeletta is also great in drawing and writing journals. It was proven through her sketchbook and diary. She was suffering from a serious heart illness for a long time and was unable to leave her bed, and is thus usually left alone in her room.

Romeo and Angeletta became very close friends. Angeletta was nicknamed by Romeo as his "Angel." Romeo and the rest of the Black Brothers helped the "Angel" to get accepted by her grandmother. They successfully convinced the "Ice Queen" that Angeletta is not after the Montovani estate. Countess Montovani then took custody of her granddaughter. She brought Angeletta to Paris to be treated for her heart illness. Romeo and Angeletta had already developed feelings for each other before they separated. Angeletta is named "Angelita" in the Tagalog dub. Angeletta`s fate is unknown and she never appears again after her departure to Paris, but Romeo mentions her at one point upon wondering how she was getting on with her treatment. Countess Montovani also appears a few episodes later and mentions that Angeletta remained in Paris.

 Countess Isabella Montovani (イザベラ・モントバーニ)
 Voiced by Nana Yamaguchi
 Countess Isabella Montovani is the grandmother of Angeletta. Her son, Count Adolfo, who fell in love with a commoner named Giovanna, was Angeletta's biological father. She used to be called "Ice Queen" because she used to have a very cold personality and she had a strong dislike towards Giovanna, due to her not being nobility and would not approve of her being Adolfo`s wife, which later forced Adolfo to leave the mansion with Giovanna and Angeletta. Following the deaths of Adolfo and Giovanna Lady Isabella entrusted the infant Angeletta to Marchelo Rossi during an unseasonable springtime snowfall. She became the benefactor of Angeletta during her entire years with Rossi's family. It took several years before the countess accepted her granddaughter. Lady Isabella would not let go of her dislike towards Angeletta`s mother and she also used to believe that Angeletta was only after the Montovani estate, but with the help of Romeo and the rest of the members of the Black Brothers, she was enlightened. In the end, Countess Montovani took custody of Angeletta. She brought her granddaughter to Paris to be treated for her serious heart illness.
 Before and after Alfredo's Death
 She reappears later to help the siblings Alfredo and Bianca Martini reclaim their inheritance and clear their tarnished names. She also attended Alfredo Martini's funeral.

 Adolfo Montovani (アドルフォ・モントバーニ)
 Voiced by Toshiyuki Morikawa & Sara Nakayama
 Lord Adolfo was the only son of Countess Isabella Montovani. He fell in love with Giovanna, a beautiful commoner and they bore a child together. Their child is Angeletta. Adolfo welcomed Giovanna and Baby Angeletta to the Montovani mansion, but Lady Isabella gave her disapproval because Giovanna was not from nobility and the honor of Adolfo's name was very important for her. This forced Adolfo and his wife to leave the mansion with the infant Angeletta. After leaving the Montovani mansion, Adolfo and Giovanna became ill and died without being personally recognized by Angeletta.

 Giovanni (ジョバンニ)
 Voiced by Nobuyuki Hiyama
 Giovanni is the leader of the Wolf Pack gang who consider themselves rivals of the Black Brothers. Despite his tough nature, he is fair when it comes to fighting. This was proven when Giovanni and his companions fought with the Black Brothers. Before their fight began, he told everybody that using any kind of weapon is not allowed. But Tachioni, one of the members of the Wolf Pack, disobeyed. He drew a blade and tried to kill Romeo. Because of this, Giovanni accepted the defeat of the Wolf Pack gang in their fight against the Black Brothers. He also does not fight the sick, as when he stopped himself from attacking Alfredo when he found out that the latter was ill from tuberculosis, the same that killed Giovanni's father. Later on in the series, Giovanni and his companions became more supportive for the Black Brothers. In the last episode of the anime, Giovanni and the rest of the members of the Wolf Pack gang decided to make peace with the Black Brothers. He first appeared in episode 10.

 Nikita (ニキータ)
 Voiced by Aya Ishizu
 A tough, red-haired girl who is a member of Giovanni's gang. Although starting off as an enemy of the Black Brothers, she gradually adopts a more friendly attitude towards them, largely because she develops a crush on Alfredo.
 Nikita is the tomboy member of the Wolf Pack gang who develops a crush on Alfredo. At first, Romeo and the rest of the Black Brothers did not know that she is a girl, except Alfredo who revealed her secret after the Wolf Pack gang lost in their battle at San Babila Church. Dante develops a crush on her after he knew that she is a girl. Nikita became more friendly to Alfredo, Romeo, and the other members of the Black Brothers in later episodes of the anime series. She first appeared in episode 7.
 After Alfredo's Death
 She was deeply saddened by the death of Alfredo. In order to recover from her depression, she swam in a river even though she knew that it was very cold because of the winter season in Milan. Before Alfredo died, he told Nikita to put a flower in her hair and that he will come running to see if she did. In the last episode of the anime, Nikita is shown wearing a flower in her hair. Before Romeo returned home to Sonogno, Nikita promised to him that she will take care of Alfredo's grave.

 Anzelmo Rossi (アンゼルモ・ロッシ)
 Voiced by Tsutomu Kashiwakura
 Son of Rossi, he uses trick to stay in the Wolf Pack, including a made-up story claiming he was from Russian royalty. He is finally discovered and beaten up by his old comrades. He takes revenge by framing Romeo for theft and beating him up. He first appeared in episode 7.

 Rinaldo (リナルド)
 Voiced by Shigeru Nakahara
 Rinaldo is a member of the Wolf Pack gang, he is nicknamed "Red" because of his red hair, he is intelligent and very strong at fighting. At the end of the story, he agrees to defend the chimney sweeps. He first appeared in episode 10.

 Tachioni (タチオーニ)
 Voiced by Shinichiro Ohta 
 Tachioni is a member of the Wolf Pack gang, he is nicknamed "The Bull", he is violent, brutal, mean, impulsive and he hated Romeo to the point of trying to kill him during a fight. He seems to have changed at the end of the story and no longer hates Romeo. He first appeared in episode 10.

 Leo (リオ)
 Voiced by Tomoko Maruo
 Leo is one of the members of the Wolf Pack gang. he is nicknamed "The Louse", he is the smallest among the members of the gang. In the Italian dub "Spicchi di Cielo tra Baffi di Fumo" and the Tagalog dub "Mga Munting Pangarap ni Romeo," he is named Rio. He first appeared in episode 10.

 Faustino (ファウスティーノ)
 Voiced by'' Kujira
 Faustino is one of the members of the Wolf Pack gang. Among the members of the gang, he is the biggest. He first appeared in episode 10.

Episodes

Series music

Theme songs

Insert songs

Other media

Artbook
 Romeo no Aoi Sora Megu Extra

CDs
 Romeo no Aoi Sora Drama and Soundtrack Vol 1 WPC6-8128
 Romeo no Aoi Sora Original Soundtrack Vol 2 WPC6-8138
 Sora E... (Opening song) Hiroko Kasahara WPD6-9037

External links 

 Samehadaku

1995 anime television series debuts
Adventure anime and manga
Animated television series about orphans
Anime based on novels
Coming-of-age anime and manga
Drama anime and manga
Fictional weasels
Historical anime and manga
Human trafficking in fiction
Romance anime and manga
Slice of life anime and manga
Television shows based on Swiss novels
Television shows set in Switzerland
Television shows set in Italy
Television series set in the 19th century
Works about economic inequality
Works about slavery
Works about social class
World Masterpiece Theater series
Victor Emmanuel II of Italy